As of 2014, the Des Moines metropolitan area is the 72nd-largest media market in the United States, as ranked by Nielsen Media Research, with 428,150 television households (0.4% of all U.S. homes). The following is a summary of broadcast and print media in Des Moines, Iowa:

Newspapers and magazines

Daily
The Des Moines Register serves as the metropolitan area's lone daily newspaper. Owned by the Gannett Company, the Register had a daily circulation of 86,982 and a Sunday circulation of 152,239, as of 2014.

University
 The Grand Views – Grand View University
 The Times Delphic– Drake University

Weekly and community

Television

Radio
 K260AM
 KASI
 KAZR
 KBGG
 KCYZ
 KDFR
 KDLF
 KDLS
 KDLS-FM
 KDPS
 KDRB
 KFMG-LP
 KGGO
 KHKI
 KICG
 KICJ
 KICL
 KICP
 KIOA
 KJJY
 KJMC
 KKDM
 KNSL
 KNWI
 KNWM
 KOEZ
 KPSZ
 KPUL
 KRNT
 KSTZ
 KURE
 KVDI
 KWBG
 KWDM
 KWKY
 KWQW
 KXIA
 KXLQ
 KXNO
 KXNO-FM
 WHO
 WOI
 WOI-FM
 WXL57

References

External links
Des Moines Broadcasting
Iowa Newspaper Association

Des Moines